64: Part II is a 2016 Japanese suspense mystery drama film directed by Takahisa Zeze. The film follows 64: Part I, released on May 7, 2016. It was released in Japan by Toho on June 11, 2016.

Plot

Cast
Kōichi Satō
Gō Ayano
Nana Eikura
Yui Natsukawa

Masataka Kubota
Yuta Kanai

Mayu Tsuruta

Shun Sugata
Yukiyoshi Ozawa

Tasuku Emoto
Kentaro Sakaguchi

Reception
The film was number-one at the Japanese box office on its opening, with 282,693 admissions and grossing . As of July 10, 2016, the film has grossed  in Japan.

References

External links
 

Japanese mystery drama films
2010s mystery drama films
Toho films
Films directed by Takahisa Zeze
2016 drama films
2010s Japanese films